Volodymyr Mykhaylovych Adamyuk (born 17 July 1991) is a Ukrainian professional footballer who plays as a right-back for Dnipro-1.

Career

Early years
Adamyuk is a product of the Youth sportive school Kalush and his first trainer was Yuriy Malyar.

Amateur years
He spent his early career as player in the amateur level.

Krymteplytsia Molodizhne
In March 2013 signed a contract with the Ukrainian First League team Krymteplytsia Molodizhne.

Stal Dniprodzerzhynsk

Dnipro

Veres Rivne

Lviv

Dnipro-1

Career statistics

References

External links
 
 

Ukrainian footballers
Association football defenders
1991 births
Living people
FC Kalush players
FC Krymteplytsia Molodizhne players
FC Stal Kamianske players
Ukrainian Premier League players
Ukrainian First League players
Ukrainian Second League players
FC Dnipro players
NK Veres Rivne players
FC Lviv players
SC Dnipro-1 players
Sportspeople from Ivano-Frankivsk Oblast